The 1994–95 Vyshcha Liha season was the 4th since its establishment. FC Dynamo Kyiv were the defending champions.

Teams

Promotions
Prykarpattia Ivano-Frankivsk, the champion of the 1993–94 Ukrainian First League  – (returning after two seasons of absence)
Evis Mykolaiv, the runner-up of the 1993–94 Ukrainian First League  – (returning after two seasons of absence)

Renamed
 On 2 October 1994 Evis Mykolaiv changed its name to SC Mykolaiv.
 During the season, Metalurh Zaporizhzhia also carried the name Metalurh-Viktor Zaporizhzhia (after a local entrepreneur Viktor Oharenko).

Location

Managers

Changes

Notes:
 The new 1994-95 season SC Tavriya Simferopol under leadership of a coach Pavlo Kostin (native of Chornomorske Raion, Crimea). Sometime after the game against Volyn (Round 10) on 23 September 1994 in Simferopol, Kostin (43 years old) perished in a car accident along with his wife. According to some sources (footballfacts.ru), Kostin perished on 15 September 1994.

League table

Results

Top goalscorers

Medal squads
(league appearances and goals listed in brackets)

Note: Players in italic are whose playing position is uncertain.

References

External links
Season record at Alexei Kobyzev website

Ukrainian Premier League seasons
1994–95 in Ukrainian association football leagues
Ukra